Kalyan Kumar Gogoi (- 30 September 2016) was an Indian politician from the state of Assam. He was a former member of Assam Legislative Assembly for Dibrugarh. He was a member of the Indian National Congress from 1996. He was a dentist before his entry to politics.

Early life and education 
Gogoi was born in 1944 in Naharkatiya to the late Moheswar Gogoi. Gogoi was an alumnus of Dibrugarh Hanumanbax Surajmall Kanoi College. He obtained his Degree in Dental Medicine from Dr R Ahmed Dental College, Kolkata.

Political career 
Gogoi joined Indian National Congress in 1996. He was the Indian National Congress candidate for Dibrugarh in the 1996 Assam Legislative Assembly election. He received 22523 votes, 40.72% of the total vote. He defeated his nearest opponent, an AGP candidate, by 5992 votes. He also defeated the incumbent MLA of Dibrugarh and former Chief Minister of Assam Kesab Chandra Gogoi who came 4th in the election.

In the 2001 Assam Legislative Assembly election, Gogoi sought reelection in Dibrugarh. He received 40675 votes, 67.57% of the total vote, defeating his nearest opponent by 25961 votes.

In the 2006 Assam Legislative Assembly election, Gogoi sought reelection in Dibrugarh. He received 28249 votes, losing to BJP candidate and the current MLA of Dibrugarh, Prasanta Phukan.

In the 2011 Assam Legislative Assembly election, Gogoi was again the Indian National Congress candidate for Dibrugarh. He received 26897 votes, 31.9% of the total vote, coming second to Prasanta Phukan by 19609 votes.

Personal life and death 
Gogoi and his wife had 3 daughters. He continued his social activities until his death.

Gogoi died at 12.45 AM on 30 September 2016, after suffering a massive heart attack. He died at his residence in ABC Colony, Guwahati and was survived by his wife, 3 daughters, sons in law, grandchildren and admirers. He died the same day as former minister and former Moran MLA Joy Chandra Nagbanshi. Assam Pradesh Congress Committee President, Ripun Bora, offered his condolences on twitter. His body was carried to his residence in Seujpur, Dibrugarh for his last rites.

References 

Assam MLAs 1996–2001
Assam MLAs 2001–2006
1944 births
2016 deaths